Yuet-ching Lee (1918 – 1997) was a Chinese actress from Hong Kong. Lee is credited with over 300 films.

Career 
In 1937, Lee began acting in Hong Kong. Lee's early films include Producing Citizens, a 1937 film directed by Lee Fa, and A Mother's Tears, a 1938 film directed by Chiu Shu-San. In 1941, Lee co-starred with Lee Sun-fung for the first time in The Metropolis. Lee was in Three Heroes, a 1941 film directed by Lee Sun-fung, who is also her husband. From 1942 to 1946, Lee was not active in the film industry. In 1960, Lee was in The Orphan, the notable last film Bruce Lee acted before he left Hong Kong. By 1969, Lee was credited with over 300 films in Hong Kong. Lee also acted in films directed by her husband. In 1986, Lee was Mrs Lam's mother in Inspector Chocolate, a comedy thriller directed by Phillip Chan.

Personal life 
Lee's husband was Lee Sun-fung, a film director. They have 5 children. During the Japanese occupation, Lee and her family fled to Guangzhouwan. Afterwards, Lee and her family moved to Vietnam. In 1940s, Lee and her family moved to Hong Kong. Lee's third son is Sil-hong Lee. On 21 May 1985, Lee's husband died.

Filmography

Films 
This is a partial list of films.
 1937 Producing Citizens 
 1938 A Mother's Tears 
 1939 Twin Sisters of the South - Mrs Chow
 1940 Everlasting Love
 1941 The Metropolis 
 1941 Three Heroes 	 	 
 1941 Follow Your Dream - Landlord's wife 
 1947 Flowers After the Storm 	 	 
 1947 Tears for the Impossible Love 	 	 
 1947 The Young Couple - Sophia's mother	
 1947 The Fickle Lady	 
 1947 Romance from Heaven 	 	 
 1947 The Fearless - Sau Chu's mother	
 1947 The Romantic Thief, Bai Juhua - Madam Shum
 1948 The Crazy Match-maker (aka The Crazy Matchmaker, Woman Dismantles White) 
 1952 Night of Romance - Aunt.
 1953 In the Face of Demolition
 1955 Cold Nights - Mrs Cheung.
 1955 The Faithful Wife 
 1960 The Orphan
 1960 The Book and the Sword (Part 1)
 1960 The Book and the Sword (Part 2)
 1964 The Beau - Ka Bo's mother
 1967 The Divorce Brinkmanship 
 1969 From Here to Eternity
 1972 Four Girls from Hong Kong - Pei-Hua's mother 
 1986 Inspector Chocolate - Mrs Lam's mother

References

External links 
 Yuet-Ching Lee at imdb.com
 Lee Yuet Ching at hkcinemagic.com
 Lee Yuet-Ching at hkmdb.com

Hong Kong film actresses
1918 births
1997 deaths